Norton-on-Tees railway station served the town of Norton, County Durham, England from 1877 to 1960, originally on the Port Clarence Branch of the Clarence Railway.

History 
However this station was poorly situated for the town it served and so the North Eastern Railway replaced this station with a new one further along the Port Clarence Branch in July 1877. 
Shortly beyond Billingham-on-Tees station, the next station to the west on the Port Clarence Branch, the former Stockton and Hartlepool Railway branched off the former Clarence Railway route towards West Hartlepool. It was originally called Norton Junction in the Bradshaw timetable but it was renamed to Norton-on-Tees on 1 October 1901.

The station remained a stop on the Durham Coast Line until it closed to both passengers and goods traffic on 7 March 1960. It was subsequently demolished in 1965.

References

External links 

Disused railway stations in the Borough of Stockton-on-Tees
Former North Eastern Railway (UK) stations
Railway stations in Great Britain opened in 1877
Railway stations in Great Britain closed in 1960
1877 establishments in England
1960 disestablishments in England